Gryr i Norden (Dawn in the North) is a Norwegian film from 1939 that was directed by Olav Dalgard. Gryr i Norden is the last film in the "worker trilogy." The other two films are Det drønner gjennom dalen (1938) and Lenkene brytes (1938).

The film is about the first major women's strike in Norway, the match workers' strike in Kristiania (now Oslo) in 1889. On the morning of October 23, 1889, the match workers at the Bryn and Grønvold match factories in the city went on strike. Working conditions were miserable, and most of the young women ended up with ruined health after a short period of performing the hazardous work, affected by phosphorus necrosis.

Cast
 Martin Gisti as Karlsen, a stevedore
 Betzy Holter as Andrine, Karlsen's wife
 Ragnhild Hald as Halldis, a manager
 Solveig Haugan as Maja
 Gunvor Hall as Svart-Anna
 Ragnhild Hagen as Nilsine
 Kolbjørn Brenda as Adolf
 Jack Fjeldstad as Krestian
 Tryggve Larssen as Oscar Nissen, a doctor
 Joachim Holst-Jensen as Christian H.
 Ingjald Haaland as Bjørnstjerne Bjørnson
 Olav Dalgard as Hans Jæger
 Bjarne Bø as Carl Jeppesen, an editor
 Astri Steiwer as Ernanda Holst
 Hans Bille as a director
 Sigurd Magnussøn as a factory manager
 Pehr Qværnstrøm as the chairman

References

External links
 
 Gryr i Norden at the National Library of Norway
 Gryr i Norden at Filmweb

Norwegian black-and-white films
1939 films
1930s Norwegian-language films
Norwegian drama films
Films directed by Olav Dalgard